The Ibanic languages are a branch of the Malayic languages indigenous to western Borneo. They are spoken by the Ibans and related groups in East Malaysia and the Indonesian province of West Kalimantan.  Other Dayak languages, called Land Dayak, which are not Ibanic, are found in the northwest corner of Kalimantan, between Ibanic and non-Ibanic Malayic languages such as Kendayan and the Malay dialects of Sarawak and Pontianak.

The term Ibanic is coined by Alfred B. Hudson, who was among the first to investigate the genetic affiliation of various languages lumped together under the name Dayak in West Borneo. Ibanic has been variously classified as belonging to a larger "Malayic Dayak" or "West Bornean Malayic" subgroup along with Kendayan and related varieties, or as a part of the "Nuclear Malayic" subgroup alongside other Malay dialects.

Languages
According to Ethnologue, four languages belong to the Ibanic subgroup: Iban, Remun (or Milikin), Mualang and Seberuang.

West Kalimantan groups

List of Ibanic-speaking Dayak ethnic subgroups and their respective languages in West Kalimantan province, Indonesia:

{| class="wikitable sortable"
! Group !! Subgroup !! Language !! Regency
|-
| Bugau|| || Benadai|| Sekadau, Sintang
|-
| Desa [dəsa] || || Desa|| Sekadau, Sintang
|-
| Ensilat|| || Ensilat|| Kapuas Hulu
|-
| Iban ||  || Iban (Benaday) || Kapuas Hulu, Sanggau
|-
| Inggar Silat|| || Inggar Silat|| Sintang
|-
| Kantu'|| || Kantu'|| Kapuas Hulu
|-
| Ketungau|| Ketungau Air Tabun || Benadai|| Sintang
|-
| Ketungau|| Ketungau Banjur || Benadai|| Sintang
|-
| Ketungau|| Ketungau Begelang || Benadai|| Sintang
|-
| Ketungau|| Ketungau Demam || Benadai|| Sintang
|-
| Ketungau|| Ketungau Embarak || Benadai|| Sintang
|-
| Ketungau|| Ketungau Kumpang || Benadai|| Sintang
|-
| Ketungau|| Ketungau Mandau || Benadai|| Sintang
|-
| Ketungau|| Ketungau Merakai || Benadai|| Sintang
|-
| Ketungau|| Ketungau Sebaru' || Benadai|| Sintang
|-
| Ketungau|| Ketungau Sekalau || Benadai|| Sintang
|-
| Ketungau|| Ketungau Sekapat || Benadai|| Sintang
|-
| Ketungau|| Ketungau Senangan || Benadai|| Sintang
|-
| Ketungau Sesae'|| || Ketungau Sesae'|| Sekadau
|-
| Mualang ||  || Mualang || Sekadau, Sintang
|-
| Rembay|| || Rembay|| Kapuas Hulu
|-
| Sebaru'|| || Sebaru'|| Kapuas Hulu
|-
| Seberuang ||  || Seberuang || Kapuas Hulu, Sintang
|-
| Sekapat|| || Sekapat|| Kapuas Hulu
|-
| Sekujam|| || Sekujam|| Sekadau, Sintang
|}

References

Further reading 

 

 
Agglutinative languages
Malayic languages